The 2008 FIIC Intercrosse Men's World Championships was the ninth Intercrosse World Championship. The championship was played in Switzerland from 15-20 July 2008. The Czech Republic defended their title.

Participants 
  Canada
  Czech Republic
  France
  Hungary
  Italy
  Switzerland

Preliminary round

Play off

5th place

Semifinals

Bronze medal game

Gold medal game

Final standings

External links 
 2008 FIIC World Championships Italy
 FIIC official site

2008 in Swiss sport
Intercrosse